In 1958 Social Club 20 de Febrero was inaugurated, and in 1908 this association decided to build its own building. So, in 1910 the engineer and architect Arturo Prins created the project, but the engineers and architects Correa and Cornejo continued with the construction. The building was built on a plot of land belonging to the Jesuit Church. It was finally inaugurated in 1913.

The access to this building was limited to a very select sector of the society of Salta, and the partners of this association had to pay $1500 per share, for its construction.

In 1950 until 1987 the building was expropriated for use as the Government House of the Province. Since then, the luxurious building has been used for cultural activities under the name of America Cultural Center. Since it had only a cultural use, every sector of the society had free access to these valuable areas.

Its restoration began in 1987 under the Department of Architectural Heritage and Preservation of Salta (better known as DePAUS). Contributors for the financing of such activity were members of the community and the Government of the Province.

The building is a part of the Monumental Complex of the Plaza 9 de Julio and represents the most valuable facade on Mitre Street. It identifies the civil-religious power, and also has a great social-cultural meaning.

This masterpiece is one of the first built with the style of Neo-Renaissance, with the objective of maintaining the style of the Cabildo, very trendy in big cities in the early twentieth century. It consists of a basement, a ground floor and first floor. It is organized around a central space with imperial staircase, illuminated by vertical and overhead windows, which together with the carpentry side express a theatrical management of the space. The facade, with plaster of Paris simile stones, occurs in three levels with arcades of Renaissance proportions. It has a balcony on the first floor. It also contains lunettes and stained glass, basketry, which crowns the attic, vases and lamps that add delicate details to the whole building.

It presents sober ornamental details in walls and ceilings, the floor is decorated with venetian mosaics and oak parquet from Slovenia. All the woodwork is made of oak.

Its infra structure consist of hidden shapes of iron, that were imported from England. This building has mezzanines of ceramic flooring blocks, it also has brick walls, and the columns have plinths of marble from Botticino pilasters, the cornices, moldings and plaster sconces are made with vegetable fibers from the area (chaguar)

The original functions were: fencing room, locker rooms, confectionery, hairdressing and services in the basement; there were a hall, a bar, a library, a billiard room and lounge on the ground floor. On the first floor there were a ballroom, meeting rooms, halls and offices. But today, it's only used as a convention center and events are performed. A wide variety of activities take place there, such as political, economical, cultural and entertainment matters. For example, artists from the whole world come here to show their creations to the everyone.

Buildings and structures in Salta Province